Claude Feidt (7 March 1936 – 13 October 2020) was a French Roman Catholic archbishop.

Feidt was born in France and was ordained to the priesthood in 1961. He served as auxiliary bishop, coadjutor archbishop and archbishop of the Roman Catholic Archdiocese of Chambéry, France from 1980 to 1999 and as archbishop of the Roman Catholic Archdiocese of Aix from 1999 to 2010.

Notes

1936 births
2020 deaths
20th-century Roman Catholic archbishops in France
21st-century Roman Catholic archbishops in France